Devireddy Sudheer Reddy (born 27 July 1962) is an Indian politician elected to Andhra Pradesh Legislative Assembly in 2009 and Telangana Legislative Assembly in 2018 for the Lal Bahadur Nagar constituency. Reddy won the seat against Mudda Ram Mohan Goud of TRS by 17,848 votes, with the former polling 113,980 votes and the latter 96,132. Previously, he served as the Chairman of the Hyderabad Urban Development Authority from 2004 to 2008. He was appointed Musi River Development Front Corporation Limited Chairman by Telangana government in February, 2020 for a period of three years.

Background 
Reddy was the youngest elected member of Municipal Corporation of Hyderabad from Malakpet constituency in 1986.

He is the first M.L.A. (Member of the Legislative Assembly) of the L.B. Nagar Constituency. L.B. Nagar, as a separate constituency emerged in 2009 polls of Andhra Pradesh after the delimitation exercise. He won the election with a total of 67510 votes.

Works as Chairman of the HUDA

Reddy spearheaded the planning and implementation of the Outer Ring Road.

He spearheaded the planning, implementation, and completion of the P V Narasimha Rao expressway, which is India's longest at 11.6 kilometers.

Reddy led several agitations for shifting of the garbage dump yard from Autonagar. In 2003, he requested then combined Andhra Pradesh Congress Legislature Party (CLP) leader Y. S. Rajasekhara Reddy to visit the dump yard. The entire garbage generated by the twin cities used to be dumped in a 40-acre dumping yard in an area of Autonagar. Over one lakh people in the nearby 20 colonies and 10 villages were suffering from dangerous health hazards, and deaths in the region increased. Y. S. Rajasekhara Reddy raised this issue in an assembly session. Sudheer Reddy, after becoming the HUDA chairman, passed orders to shift the Autonagar dump yard from Hyderabad.

Reddy took initiatives to protect the environment and lakes by installing sewage treatment plants. He said that sewage generated from the colonies in Madhapur and Jubilee Hills had flowed into the lake for years, polluting Durgam Cheruvu.

He has taken up initiative of plantation drive in 11 mandals, covering 109 panchayats outside the municipal corporation limits of Hyderabad. As a part of this program, two lakhs plants were planted in record time.

Padayatra 

In 2003, Y. S. Rajasekhara Reddy began a 60-day, 1,500 km padayatra to highlight problems which were being faced by farmers due to drought. Sudheer Reddy accompanied Rajasekhara Reddy on the padayatra. Sudheer Reddy helped organise rallies and public meetings between villages with locals.

Family 

Sudheer Reddy was born to D. Jayachandra Reddy and D. Chandrakala. His father was a government employee in the combined state of Andhra Pradesh. He is married to Devireddy Kamala Sudheer Reddy and has two children, namely Preetham and Goutham.

References

Living people
Telangana MLAs 2018–2023
Andhra Pradesh MLAs 2009–2014
Telangana Rashtra Samithi politicians
1962 births